Metropolis is the debut studio album by Robby Maria and was released on March 8, 2013.

Track listing
all music composed by Robby Maria, all lyrics by Robby Maria .
 Days In The City – 3:24
 In The Light Of The Summer – 1:44
 Run & Hide – 2:59
 Secret Alphabets – 2:09
 Butterfly – 2:13
 Metropolis – 6:14
 You're A Memory – 3:03
 Move Along – 2:44
 Troublemaker – 1:44
 European Queen – 3:39
 Troubadour – 3:24
 Love Song – 2:27
 Woman In You – 4:17
 Har-ma.ged'on – 3:53

Personnel
Anni Müller – drums, percussions

Album ratings
Ferdinand Martinelli from the online-Musikmagazine Newcomerszene wrote: „...with minimal instrumentation Robby shows us a unique world full of beautiful melodies and catchy rhythms played by Berlin drummer Anni Müller. The Album contains european folkrock music at its best “.Albumcheck.de voted with 8 out of 10 points  and Martin Döring from Musikrezensionen wrote: „... the tracks are very thoughtful and great to listen to which is highly owed to Robby's excellent and interesting voice.“

References

2013 albums
Robby Maria albums